born in Tokyo, Japan on September 9, 1936, is a Japanese scholar. He specializes in the areas of history of science and philosophy of science.

Murakami studied at the Hibiya High School before attaining his undergraduate degree at Tokyo University in the field of education. After teaching for a brief period at Sophia University in Yotsuya, he moved to teach at International Christian University in Mitaka, Tokyo.

Murakami has written numerous books and essays on a variety of subjects the field of the study of science itself. Under the history of science his field of specialization lies in physics. His current research focuses primarily on the philosophical concept of the reconciliation of border transgression in the context of the paradigm.

Murakami is also known to play the cello.

References

1936 births
Living people
Japanese philosophers
Philosophers of science
University of Tokyo alumni